The New Zealand Derby is a set-weights Thoroughbred horse race for three-year-olds, run over a distance of 2,400 metres (12 furlongs) at Ellerslie Racecourse in Auckland, New Zealand. It is held on the first Saturday in March, as the opening day of Auckland Cup Week. The purse of the race in 2020 was $1 million.

History
The New Zealand Derby is an amalgamation of two races – the New Zealand Derby, run since 1860 at Riccarton, Christchurch; and the Great Northern Derby, run since 1875 at Ellerslie Racecourse in Auckland. The races were combined in 1973. Riccarton was awarded two 1,600 m races for three-year-olds in place of its Derby – the New Zealand 2000 Guineas and New Zealand 1000 Guineas.

After its May debut, the New Zealand Derby was soon moved to New Year's Day, and then to Boxing Day. It continued to be run on this day for many years and became a popular traditional social occasion for Aucklanders until it was moved to the first day of the new Auckland Cup Week in March. The first March running of the Derby in 2006 was won by Wahid, from the stable of Allan Sharrock in New Plymouth.

The race in 2023 - won by "Sharp 'N' Smart" - was held at Te Rapa Racecourse, due to renovation of the track at Ellerslie Racecourse.

Notable winners

Many of New Zealand's most famous racehorses feature on the list of New Zealand Derby winners, including:
 Desert Gold, 
 Gloaming, 
 Nightmarch, 
 Kindergarten, 
 Mainbrace, 
 Balmerino, 
 Bonecrusher, 
 Xcellent, 
 Jimmy Choux, 
 Silent Achiever,
 Mongolian Khan.

Multiple winning trainers and jockeys

Roger James has won the New Zealand Derby five times, including once in partnership with Jim Gibbs. Colin Jillings won the post-1973 New Zealand Derby three times but also twice won the Great Northern Derby with Lawful and Stipulate.

Vinnie Colgan holds the record for the most Derby wins by a jockey. He scored his fifth Derby win aboard Habibi in 2013, breaking Robert Vance's previous record of four, and added a sixth victory with Rangipo in 2016.

Winning fillies

Only a small number of fillies have ever won the Derby against the male horses. This list includes:

 the great Desert Gold winning the 1915 New Zealand Derby at Riccarton and the 1916 Great Northern Derby
 Our Flight in 1983
 Tidal Light in 1986
 Popsy in 1994
 Silent Achiever in 2012
 Habibi in 2013.

On two of those occasions, fillies have also finished second – Cure in 1986 and Fix in 2013.

New Zealand Derby results

 Not run in 2005 with change of date from December to March
 In the 1987 race Accountant was first past the post, but relegated.

Winners of the New Zealand Derby at Riccarton

Note: the New Zealand Derby (Riccarton) and the Great Northern Derby were combined into one race at Ellerslie in 1973.

 1860 Ada
 1861 Otto
 1862 Emmeline
 1863 Azucena
 1864 Opera
 1865 Egremont
 1866 Nebula
 1867 Scandal
 1868 Flying Jib
 1869 Manuka
 1870 Envy
 1871 Defamation
 1872 Calumny
 1873 Papapa
 1874 Tadmor
 1875 Daniel O'Rourke
 1876 Songster
 1877 Trump Card
 1878 Natator
 1879 Hornby
 1880 Sir Modred
 1881 The Dauphin
 1882 Cheviot
 1883 Oudeis
 1884 Black Rose
 1885 Stonyhurst
 1886 Disowned
 1887 Maxim
 1888 Manton
 1889 Scots Grey
 1890 Medallion
 1891 Florrie
 1892 Stepniak
 1893 Skirmisher
 1894 Blue Fire
 1895 Euroclydon
 1896 Uniform
 1897 Multiform
 1898 Altair
 1899 Seahorse
 1900 Renown
 1901 Menschikoff
 1902 Orloff
 1903 Roseal
 1904 Nightfall
 1905 Noctiform
 1906 Zimmerman
 1907 Elevation
 1908 Husbandman
 1909 Elysian
 1910 Danube
 1911 Masterpiece
 1912 Bon Reve
 1913 Cherubini
 1914 Balboa
 1915 Desert Gold
 1916 The Toff
 1917 Estland
 1918 Gloaming (AUS)
 1919 Rossini
 1920 Duo
 1921 Winning Hit
 1922 Enthusiasm
 1923 Black Ronald
 1924 Count Cavour
 1925 Runnymede
 1926 Commendation
 1927 Agrion
 1928 Nightmarch
 1929 Honour
 1930 Cylinder
 1931 Bronze Eagle (AUS)
 1932 Silver Scorn
 1933 Nightly
 1934 Sporting Blood
 1935 Lowenberg
 1936 Wild Chase
 1937 Royal Chief
 1938 Defaulter
 1939 Beaulivre
 1940 Enrich
 1941 Battledress
 1942 Rink
 1943 Tara King
 1944 Pensacola
 1945 Al-Sirat
 1946 Royal Tan
 1947 Liebestraum
 1948 St. Bruno
 1949 Beaumaris
 1950 The Unicorn
 1951 Dalray
 1952 Programme
 1953 Idaho
 1954 Port Boy
 1955 Syntax
 1956 Passive
 1957 William Paul
 1958 Up and Coming
 1959 Sol d'Or
 1960 Blue Lodge
 1961 Burgos
 1962 Algalon
 1963 Royal Duty
 1964 Trial Offer
 1965 Roman Consul
 1966 Fair Account
 1967 Jazz
 1968 Pep
 1969 Piko
 1970 Fairview Lad
 1971 Master John
 1972 Classic Wave

Earlier winners (Great Northern Derby) 

Note: the New Zealand Derby (Riccarton) and the Great Northern Derby were combined into the one race at Ellerslie in 1973.

1875 – Toi
1876 – Ariel
1877 – Danebury
1878 – Venus Transit
1879 – Omega
1880 – Libeller
1881 – Tim Whiffler
1882 – Fitz Hercules
1883 – Welcome Jack
1884 – Nelson
1885 – Tigridia
1886 – Foul Shot
1887 – Disowned
1888 – Sextant
1889 – Cuirassier
1890 – Tirailleur
1891 – Medallion
1892 – Morion
1893 – St. Hippo
1894 – Loyalty
1895 – Stepfeldt
1896 – Fabulist
1897 – Nestor
1898 – St. Crispin
1899 – Blue Jacket
1900 – Miss Delaval
1901 – Renown
1902 – Menschikoff
1903 – Wairiki
1904 – Gladsome
1905 – Gladstone
1906 – Multifid
1907 – Zimmerman
1908 – Boniform
1909 – Husbandman
1910 – Kilwinning
1911 – Danube
1912 – Counterfeit
1913 – Bon Reve
1914 – Cherubini
1915 – Reputation
1916 – Desert Gold
1917 – Sasanof
1918 – Estland
1919 – Gloaming
1920 – Royal Stag
1921 – Gasbag
1922 – Winning Hit
1923 – Enthusiasm
1924 – Ballymena
1925 – Count Cavour
1926 – Star Stranger
1927 – Commendation
1928 – Martarma
1929 – Red Heckle
1930 – Hunting Cry
1931 – Karapoti
1932 – Bronze Eagle
1933 – Silver Scorn
1934 – Red Manfred
1935 – Gay Blonde
1936 – Greek Shepherd
1937 – Essex
1938 – Courtcraft
1939 – Defaulter
1940 – Beau Vite
1941 – Kindergarten
1942 – Regal Fox
1943 – Indian Princess
1944 – Expanse
1945 – Coronaire
1946 – Lady Foxbridge
1947 – Beau Le Havre
1948 – Sweet Nymph
1949 – Tauloch
1950 – Sweet Spray
1951 – Mainbrace
1952 – Dalray
1953 – Programme
1954 – Fox Myth
1955 – Somerset Fair
1956 – Syntax
1957 – Passive/Gibraltar
1958 – Lawful
1959 – Gitano
1960 – Stipulate
1961 – Cracksman
1962 – Tatua
1963 – Ichtar
1964 – Sobig
1965 – Peterman
1966 – Star Belle
1967 – Ben Lomond
1968 – Bardall
1969 – Piko
1970 – Kirrama
1971 – Master John
1972 – Corroboree

See also

 2021 New Zealand Derby
 2020 New Zealand Derby
 2019 New Zealand Derby
 2018 New Zealand Derby
 2017 New Zealand Derby
 2016 New Zealand Derby
 2015 New Zealand Derby
 2014 New Zealand Derby
 2013 New Zealand Derby
 2012 New Zealand Derby
 2011 New Zealand Derby
 2010 New Zealand Derby
 New Zealand Derby (Riccarton) forerunner of the New Zealand Derby
 Great Northern Derby forerunner of the New Zealand Derby
 Recent winners of major NZ 3 year old races
 Desert Gold Stakes
 Hawke's Bay Guineas
 Karaka Million
 Levin Classic
 New Zealand 1000 Guineas
 New Zealand 2000 Guineas
 New Zealand Oaks

Reference list

 N.Z. Thoroughbred Racing Inc.
 http://www.racenet.com.au
 http://www.nzracing.co.nz
 http://www.tab.co.nz
 http://www.racebase.co.nz
 The Great Decade of New Zealand racing 1970-1980. Glengarry, Jack. William Collins Publishers Ltd, Wellington, New Zealand.
 New Zealand Thoroughbred Racing Annual 2018 (47th edition). Dennis Ryan, Editor, Racing Media NZ Limited, Auckland, New Zealand.
 New Zealand Thoroughbred Racing Annual 2017 (46th edition). Dennis Ryan, Editor, Racing Media NZ Limited, Auckland, New Zealand.
 New Zealand Thoroughbred Racing Annual 2008 (37th edition). Bradford, David, Editor.  Bradford Publishing Limited, Paeroa, New Zealand.
 New Zealand Thoroughbred Racing Annual 2005 (34th edition). Bradford, David, Editor.  Bradford Publishing Limited, Paeroa, New Zealand.
 New Zealand Thoroughbred Racing Annual 2004 (33rd edition). Bradford, David, Editor.  Bradford Publishing Limited, Paeroa, New Zealand.
 New Zealand Thoroughbred Racing Annual 2000 (29th edition). Bradford, David, Editor.  Bradford Publishing Limited, Auckland, New Zealand.
 New Zealand Thoroughbred Racing Annual 1997  (26th edition). Dillon, Mike, Editor. Mike Dillon's Racing Enterprises Ltd, Auckland, New Zealand.
 New Zealand Thoroughbred Racing Annual 1995 (24th edition). Dillon, Mike, Editor. Mike Dillon's Racing Enterprises Ltd, Auckland, New Zealand.
 New Zealand Thoroughbred Racing Annual 1994 (23rd edition). Dillon, Mike, Editor. Meadowset Publishing, Auckland, New Zealand.
 New Zealand Thoroughbred Racing Annual 1991  (20th edition). Dillon, Mike, Editor. Moa Publications, Auckland, New Zealand.
 New Zealand Thoroughbred Racing Annual 1987 (16th edition). Dillon, Mike, Editor. Moa Publications, Auckland, New Zealand.
 New Zealand Thoroughbred Racing Annual 1985 (Fourteenth edition). Costello, John, Editor. Moa Publications, Auckland, New Zealand.
 New Zealand Thoroughbred Racing Annual 1984 (Thirteenth edition). Costello, John, Editor. Moa Publications, Auckland, New Zealand.
 New Zealand Thoroughbred Racing Annual 1982 (Eleventh edition). Costello, John, Editor. Moa Publications, Auckland, New Zealand.
 New Zealand Thoroughbred Racing Annual 1981 (Tenth edition). Costello, John, Editor. Moa Publications, Auckland, New Zealand.
 New Zealand Thoroughbred Racing Annual 1980 (Ninth edition). Costello, John, Editor. Moa Publications, Auckland, New Zealand.
 New Zealand Thoroughbred Racing Annual 1979 (Eighth edition).Costello, John, Editor. Moa Publications, Auckland, New Zealand.
 New Zealand Thoroughbred Racing Annual 1978 (Seventh edition).Costello, John, Editor. Moa Publications, Auckland, New Zealand.
 New Zealand Thoroughbred Racing Annual 1976. Costello, John, Editor. Moa Publications, Auckland.

 
Horse races in New Zealand
Flat horse races for three-year-olds